Agur Jaunak ("Greetings, Sirs!"), is a Basque song which is sung at particular ceremonies to welcome someone recently arrived or to say goodbye to a friend, or to welcome a visitor as he/she deserves to be. It consists of a form of displaying honour and welcoming those present and the guests. Normally it is sung a cappella in one or various voices, and it is a custom that the audience stand up to hear this song.

Origins
It comes from a popular Lapurdian melody for hunting and in its evolution has been adapted into other versions by multiple musicians. Jose Olaizola Gabarain was the author of the first and best-known version of "Agur Jaunak". It was presented for the first time on 1 August 1918 in the Sanctuary of Loyola for the festival of Saint Ignatius. It became popular at the celebration of the Congress of Basque Studies that took place in Oñati in September 1918.

Despite all of this it is difficult to state categorically where certain popular melodies originated — as José Luis Ansorena says, "no language can brag that it has not been influenced by another; there is no songbook in the world which can boast absolute autonomy". Ansorena stated on the 22nd of August 1983:

Antonio Peña y Goñi, a celebrated composer, musicologist and music and bullfighting critic and the founder of the Orfeón Donostiarra (San Sebastian concert choir), explained the origin of this song in a conference which was held in 1898 at the Madrid Press Association:

Translation to English

The  translation needs certain explanations from the original Basque words:

"Agur" is a Basque word that we can translate into English both as "hail" and as "farewell".

"Jaunak" in the context of the song means gentlemen, sirs, people of certain social stature, someone who deserves certain courtesy.

When you are appreciated a lot or you are held in great esteem or profound respect one says "Agur t´erdi" — with a strange translation of "hello/goodbye 'and a half'" — which in the Basque Country is one of the highest greetings.

When we say "Hemen gire", which means "here we are", we make reference to a feeling, and it says to us: here we are and we will continue here because it is our land, here we are to serve you.

It is said that whenever this melody and song are performed, Basque people stand up.

Partiture
The work was written in three-beat meter ¾. Its melody is a simple, unique tone; it basically moves over two chords (tonic and dominant).

Bibliography
  Agur Jaunak Auñamendi Eusko Entziklopedia
  PÉREZ ARREGUI, Ignacio: El Diario Vasco, 31-VII; 1-VIII-1963 
  EZCURDIA, Luis: Los Miqueletes, 211-218. Zarauz : Icharopena , D.L. 1968

References
 Article written by Jose Luis Ansorena Miranda: "Procedencia de algunas melodías populares vascas" (The origins of some Basque folk songs). Published in 1999, Txistulari, nº 179, pp 5–13

Spanish folk songs
Basque music
Year of song unknown
Songwriter unknown